, also known as Yasuhara Shrine, is a Japanese Shinto shrine in Oita, Oita on the island of Kyushu.

History
Yusuhara is believed to have been built in the early 9th century.  It was established as a branch shrine temple (miyadera) of Usa jingū.

Yusuhara was the chief Shinto shrine (ichinomiya) of the old Bungo Province.  It serves today as one of the ichinomiya of Niigata Prefecture.  
 The enshrined kami are:
 
 
 

See also
 List of Shinto shrines in Japan
 Modern system of ranked Shinto Shrines

References

External links 

  Map of shrine (Bungo-no-Kuni Ohno-gun Yusuhara Hachimangu zu) at National Archives of Japan

Shinto shrines in Ōita Prefecture
Beppyo shrines